The Tainan Municipal Cultural Center (TMCC) is a cultural center in East District, Tainan, Taiwan.

History
The construction of the center started in June 1980 and was inaugurated on 6 October 1984 as Tainan Municipal Cultural Center. In 2000, it was renamed to Tainan Municipal Arts Center. However, on 20 May 2004 it was renamed back again to Tainan Municipal Cultural Center.

Buildings
 Cultural Artifacts Exhibition Hall
 International Conference Hall
 Performing Hall

Notable events
 40th Golden Horse Awards

Transportation
The cultural center is accessible South from Tainan Station of Taiwan Railways.

See also
 List of tourist attractions in Taiwan

References

External links

 

1984 establishments in Taiwan
Cultural centers in Tainan
East District, Tainan
Event venues established in 1984